Robert Bernard Cornelis Noorduyn  (April 6, 1893 – February 22, 1959) was a Dutch-born American aircraft designer and manufacturer.  He is best known for the Noorduyn Norseman, a legendary Canadian bush plane  produced in the 1930s to 1940s and again in the 1950s.

Early life

Noorduyn was born in Nijmegen, Netherlands to a Dutch father, Bernardus Noorduijn (1860–1910), and an English mother, Harriet Ellen Churchill.

After Noorduyn had received a technical training in the Netherlands and Germany, in 1913, he moved to England. There he trained to fly in a Caudron G II and worked as a technical draughtsmen for the Sopwith company.

In 1917, Noorduyn was recruited to become the chief draughtsman for the British Aerial Transport company. (Chief designer of the company was another Dutchman: along with Frits Koolhoven) British Aerial Transport or BAT however was short-lived. A victim of the changing tides following the end of World War I, it folded in 1919. By that time however, Anthony Fokker had returned from Germany and established a new factory in the Netherlands. Noorduyn returned just as well and found work with Fokker. Since Fokker wanted to expand into the USA, the company sent Noorduyn in 1921 to Teterboro to supervise a new manufacturing plant.

Designs
In Teterboro, Noorduyn  was responsible for the Fokker Universal, a popular utility transport that was particularly suitable for northern conditions. Many examples were sold to Canadian air carriers. The Fokker Universal and its follow-up Super Universal helped open the frontiers, fostering settlement and development of the north. In addition, Noorduyn worked on the re-design of the single-engine Fokker F.VIII into a twin-engined version.

Noorduyn moved at the beginning of 1929 to Bellanca in Wilmington, Delaware, where he designed the Bellanca Skyrocket. He was also heavily involved in the design of an improved version of the Bellanca Pacemaker, another favourite of bush flyers in Canada.

In 1932, while at the Pitcairn-Cierva Autogyro Company of America, Noorduyn was responsible for the design of the first enclosed, four-seater autogiro, the Pitcairn PA-19.

Noorduyn Norseman
Having worked on designs at Fokker, Bellanca and Pitcairn-Cierva, Noorduyn created his own design in 1934, the Noorduyn Norseman. Along with colleague Walter Clayton, Noorduyn created the company Noorduyn Aircraft Limited in early 1933 at Montreal. A successor company bearing the name Noorduyn Aviation, was later established in 1935.

Noorduyn's bush plane design revolved around a few basic criteria: it should be an aircraft with which a Canadian operator utilizing existing talents, equipment, and facilities could make money; it should be a high-wing monoplane to facilitate loading and unloading of passengers and cargo at seaplane docks and airports; and it should be an all-around superior aircraft to those currently in use in Canada. The final design layout looked much like one of the Fokker models with all-welded steel tubing fuselage structure and wood stringers were applied to it for attachment of a fabric skin. The wing was all-wood construction and fabric-covered except for the flaps and ailerons, which were  made of welded steel tubing. The resulting utility bush plane, known as the Norseman, flew for the first time in 1936. Since then it has been used as both a military and civil cargo aircraft.

Final years
In 1953, Noorduyn headed a group  of investors who bought back the jigs and equipment from Canadian Car & Foundry and started a  new company called Noorduyn Norseman Aircraft Ltd. Bob Noorduyn became ill and died in his home in South Burlington, Vermont, on February 22, 1959, but the company he had created, provided support for operating Norseman aircraft and built three new Mk Vs before selling its assets in 1982 to Norco Associates. Norco provided service only, as the manufacture of a new Norseman aircraft, being very labor-intensive, made it very expensive.

References
Notes

Bibliography

 Milberry, Larry. Aviation in Canada. Toronto: McGraw-Hill Ryerson, 1979. .
 Munson, Kenneth. Bombers, Patrol and Transport Aircraft 1939-1945. London: Blandford Press, 1969. .

External links
 Noorduyn
 R.B.C.Noorduyn in 1912

1893 births
1959 deaths
Canadian aerospace engineers
People from Nijmegen
Dutch emigrants to Canada
Dutch aerospace engineers
Canadian people of English descent
Dutch people of World War I